Live in L.A. (Death & Raw) is a live album released by Death. It was recorded on December 5, 1998, in Los Angeles at the Whisky a Go Go and released on October 16, 2001, through Nuclear Blast. The album was also released in DVD format. The album was not remastered for sound and captured the original sound from the live performance.

This was one of two Death albums originally released to raise money for Chuck Schuldiner's cancer treatment.

Track listing

Personnel
 Chuck Schuldiner – vocals, guitar
 Richard Christy – drums
 Scott Clendenin – bass
 Shannon Hamm – guitar

References

Death (metal band) albums
2001 live albums